Danna Azrieli Hakim (born 3 June 1967; Montreal, Canada) is an Israeli real-estate developer, and philanthropist.  Azrieli has been Chairwoman of Azrieli Group, a publicly real estate company in Israel, since 2014. Azrieli is also Chairwoman of the Azrieli Foundation (Israel), and a member of the Azrieli Foundation (Canada), and  a board member of the Weizmann Institute of Science, Tel Aviv University, and the Darca schools. She has an estimated net worth of $1.9 billion.

Biography

Azrieli was born in Montreal, Canada. She is the youngest daughter of Stephanie Lefcort Azrieli and the late David Azrieli, Canadian real estate developer. Azrieli and her sisters, Naomi and Sharon, own 46 percent of the Azrieli Group, a company founded by their father. It is known for developing shopping malls and office buildings in Israel. They inherited their stakes after Azrieli died in 2014.

Azrieli attended Herzliah High School and holds a BA in Sociology and Anthropology, from Swarthmore College in 1990, and a Juris Doctor (JD) from Vermont Law School, in 1993. Upon immigrating to Israel in 2000, Azrieli worked at Gornitzky & Co. til 2002 when she joined the Azrieli Group.

Career
Before appointed as Chairwoman of Azrieli Group, Azrieli worked at the family's real estate business arm in the United States, Canpro Investment Ltd. From 2006, Azrieli was a director of Granite HaCarmel, and of its subsidiaries, Tambour, Sonol, Supergas and GES. Azrieli was appointed as deputy Chairwoman of the Azrieli Group in 2010, when the company went public.  She went on to act as Chairwoman of the Azrieli group in 2014 and was officially appointed to the role following her father's death in July of that year.

During the years 2014-2021 the company increased its market capitalization from NIS 12 billion to a value of NIS 37 billion. In this time, Azrieli Group built the Azrieli Sarona Tower, a skyscraper in Sarona neighborhood, Tel Aviv. the Palace Senior housing projects and other projects across Israel including Rishonim, Ramla Mall, in Holon, and Azrieli Town in Tel Aviv. In 2016, Azrieli Group launched an Omnichannel ecommerce website, azrieli.com.
The company entered into the data center field in 2019 when it acquired 24% of the US-based company  Compass for $200 million. In July 2021, the group purchased the Norwegian company Green Mountain Data Centers for NIS 2.8 billion the company entered other new sectors, the company's real estate interests were diversified further to include the hotel sector and rental housing market.

Philanthropy
As Chairwoman of the Azrieli Foundation (Israel), and a member of the Canadian Azrieli Foundation, Azrieli supports a range of education programs, universities, research institutes, medical centers and hospitals. In 2004, she founded the Azrieli Empowerment Program that supports over 4000 at-risk middle school students across Israel. The program is currently managed by Darca schools, where Azrieli serves as a board member. The Azrieli Foundation committed NIS 110 million to support the Empowerment Program and has recently donated another NIS 10 million for the "ELA" Educational Leadership Accelerator program

In 2018, Azrieli was the Israeli Chair of the General Assembly of the Jewish Federation Annual Meeting in Israel. Azrieli spearheaded Tel-Aviv University's 2019 Architect Competition, as part of the Azrieli Foundation's NIS 75 million commitment to establish the David Azrieli School of Architecture in the university. Azrieli sits on a number of boards including the International Board of Governors of the Weizmann Institute of Science,  the Board of Governors of Tel Aviv University, and the board of the Holocaust Claims Conference, which promotes Shoah education and research and provides grants to organizations that assist Holocaust survivors around the world. She is also known for speaking about her father, who was a Holocaust survivor.

Books
 Danna Azrieli, One Step Ahead: David J. Azrieli (Azrylewicz) : Memoirs 1939–1950. Yad Vashem, Jerusalem 2001

See also 
 Azrieli Group
 David Azrieli

References

External links
 Forbes: The World's Billionaires: Danna Azrieli, Forbes, November 2021
 Danna Hakim Azrieli – Chairman, Azrieli Group Ltd, Bloomberg
 Azrieli Group Website
 Azrieli Foundation Israel Website

1967 births
Israeli billionaires
20th-century Israeli businesswomen
20th-century Israeli businesspeople
Canadian emigrants to Israel
Living people
Female billionaires
Israeli philanthropists
Jewish women philanthropists
Israeli business executives
Swarthmore College people
Swarthmore College alumni
Vermont Law and Graduate School alumni